Cabassous is a genus of South and Central American armadillos.  The name is the Latinised form of the Kalini word for "armadillo".<ref name=Hayssen2014>{{cite journal | author = Hayssen, V. | date = 2014 | title = Cabassous unicinctus | journal = Mammalian Species | issue = 907 | pages = 16–23 | doi = 10.1644/907| doi-access = free }}</ref>

Cladogram of living Cabassous''

The genus contains the following four species:

References

Armadillos
Mammal genera
Taxonomy articles created by Polbot